Henry Howard (1871 – after 1906) was an English professional footballer who played as a wing half. Born in Rotherham, he had trials with Rotherham Town and Sheffield Wednesday before joining Sheffield United, for whom he made 48 appearances in the Football League. He went on to play 51 games in all competitions for Small Heath.

Notes

References

1871 births
Year of death missing
Footballers from Rotherham
English footballers
Association football wing halves
Sheffield United F.C. players
Birmingham City F.C. players
Wisbech Town F.C. players
English Football League players
Place of death missing